Tiger stripes could refer to:

 The stripes on a tiger
 Tigerstripe camouflage scheme
 The Tiger Stripes colour scheme
 Tiger Stripes (Enceladus), geological formations on one of Saturn's moons